Chang Jung Christian University is a railway station on the Taiwan Railways Administration (TRA) Shalun line in Gueiren District, Tainan, Taiwan.

Name
The station was named after the nearby Chang Jung Christian University.

History
The station was opened on 2 January 2011. Similar to other stations on the line, it is equipped with multiple card-reading machines.

Around the station
 Chang Jung Christian University

See also
 List of railway stations in Taiwan

References

2011 establishments in Taiwan
Railway stations in Tainan
Railway stations opened in 2011
Railway stations served by Taiwan Railways Administration